Yelovsky District is an administrative district (raion) of Perm Krai, Russia; one of the thirty-three in the krai. As a municipal division, it is incorporated as Yelovsky Municipal District. It is located in the southwest of the krai. Its administrative center is the rural locality (a selo) of Yelovo. Population:  The population of Yelovo accounts for 49.7% of the district's total population.

History
The district was established on January 15, 1924.

Demographics
The most numerous ethnic groups, according to the 2002 Census, include Russians at 94.1% and the Chuvash people at 2.6%.

References

Notes

Sources

Districts of Perm Krai
States and territories established in 1924